Kiyotaka Hayakawa (17 July 1946 – 29 March 2005) was a Japanese handball player who competed in the 1972 Summer Olympics.

References

1946 births
2005 deaths
Japanese male handball players
Olympic handball players of Japan
Handball players at the 1972 Summer Olympics
20th-century Japanese people